This is a list of United States senators from Kansas. Kansas was admitted to the Union on January 29, 1861, and its senators belong to Class 2 and Class 3. Kansas's current senators are Republicans Jerry Moran and Roger Marshall. 29 of Kansas's senators have been Republicans, three have been Democrats, and two have been Populists. 

Kansas last elected a Democratic senator in 1932, and both seats have been occupied by Republicans since 1939, the longest current streak of one party controlling both of a state's Senate seats. Its Class 2 seat has been occupied consecutively by Republicans since 1919, the longest current streak for a single seat in the country.

List of senators

|- style="height:2em"
| rowspan=2 colspan=3 | Vacant
| rowspan=2 | Jan 29, 1861 –Apr 4, 1861
| rowspan=2 | 
| rowspan=4 | 1
| 
| —
| rowspan=2 | 
| rowspan=2 | Jan 29, 1861 –Apr 4, 1861
| rowspan=2 colspan=3 | Vacant

|- style="height:2em"
| rowspan=2 
| rowspan=6 | 1

|- style="height:2em"
! rowspan=3 | 1
| rowspan=3 align=left | James H. Lane
| rowspan=3  | Republican
| rowspan=3 nowrap | Apr 4, 1861 –Jul 11, 1866
| rowspan=2 | Elected in 1861.
| rowspan=5 | Elected in 1861.
| rowspan=8 nowrap | Apr 4, 1861 –Mar 3, 1873
| rowspan=8  | Republican
| rowspan=8 align=right | Samuel C. Pomeroy
! rowspan=8 | 1

|- style="height:2em"
| 

|- style="height:2em"
| Re-elected in 1865.Died.
| rowspan=5 | 2
| rowspan=3 

|- style="height:2em"
| colspan=3 | Vacant
| nowrap | Jul 11, 1866 –Jul 25, 1866
|  

|- style="height:2em"
! rowspan=3 | 2
| rowspan=3 align=left | Edmund Ross
| rowspan=3  | Republican
| rowspan=3 nowrap | Jul 25, 1866 –Mar 3, 1871
| rowspan=3 | Appointed to continue Lane's term.Elected in 1867 to finish Lane's term.Lost re-election.

|- style="height:2em"
| 
| rowspan=3 | 2
| rowspan=3 | Re-elected in 1867.Lost re-election.

|- style="height:2em"
| 

|- style="height:2em"
! rowspan=2 | 3
| rowspan=2 align=left | Alexander Caldwell
| rowspan=2  | Republican
| rowspan=2 nowrap | Mar 4, 1871 –Mar 24, 1873
| rowspan=2 | Elected in 1871.Resigned in 1873.
| rowspan=6 | 3
| 

|- style="height:2em"
| rowspan=4 
| rowspan=6 | 3
| rowspan=6 | Elected in 1873.
| rowspan=12 nowrap | Mar 4, 1873 –Mar 3, 1891
| rowspan=12  | Republican
| rowspan=12 align=right | John James Ingalls
! rowspan=12 | 2

|- style="height:2em"
| colspan=3 | Vacant
| nowrap | Mar 24, 1873 –Nov 24, 1873
|  

|- style="height:2em"
! 4
| align=left | Robert Crozier
|  | Republican
| nowrap | Nov 24, 1873 –Feb 2, 1874
| Appointed to continue Caldwell's term.Retired when successor elected.

|- style="height:2em"
! rowspan=2 | 5
| rowspan=2 align=left | James Harvey
| rowspan=2  | Republican
| rowspan=2 nowrap | Feb 2, 1874 –Mar 3, 1877
| rowspan=2 | Elected in 1874 to finish Caldwell's term.

|- style="height:2em"
| 

|- style="height:2em"
! rowspan=8 | 6
| rowspan=8 align=left | Preston B. Plumb
| rowspan=8  | Republican
| rowspan=8 nowrap | Mar 4, 1877 –Dec 20, 1891
| rowspan=3 | Elected in 1877.
| rowspan=3 | 4
| 

|- style="height:2em"
| 
| rowspan=3 | 4
| rowspan=3 | Re-elected in 1879.

|- style="height:2em"
| 

|- style="height:2em"
| rowspan=3 | Re-elected in 1883.

| rowspan=3 | 5
| 

|- style="height:2em"
| 
| rowspan=3 | 5
| rowspan=3 | Re-elected in 1885.Lost re-election.

|- style="height:2em"
| 

|- style="height:2em"
| rowspan=2 | Re-elected in 1888.Died.
| rowspan=5 | 6
| 

|- style="height:2em"
| rowspan=3 
| rowspan=5 | 6
| rowspan=5 | Elected in 1891.Lost re-election.
| rowspan=5 nowrap | Mar 4, 1891 –Mar 3, 1897
| rowspan=5  | Populist
| rowspan=5 align=right | William A. Peffer
! rowspan=5 | 3

|- style="height:2em"
| colspan=3 | Vacant
| nowrap | Dec 20, 1891 –Jan 1, 1892
|  

|- style="height:2em"
! 7
| align=left | Bishop Perkins
|  | Republican
| nowrap | Jan 1, 1892 –Mar 4, 1893
| Appointed to continue Plumb's term.Retired when successor qualified.

|- style="height:2em"
! 8
| align=left | John Martin
|  | Democratic
| nowrap | Mar 4, 1893 –Mar 3, 1895
| Elected in 1893 to finish Plumb's term.
| 

|- style="height:2em"
! rowspan=3 | 9
| rowspan=3 align=left | Lucien Baker
| rowspan=3  | Republican
| rowspan=3 nowrap | Mar 4, 1895 –Mar 3, 1901
| rowspan=3 | Elected in 1895.Lost renomination.
| rowspan=3 | 7
| 

|- style="height:2em"
| 
| rowspan=3 | 7
| rowspan=3 | Elected in 1897.Lost re-election.
| rowspan=3 nowrap | Mar 4, 1897 –Mar 3, 1903
| rowspan=3  | Populist
| rowspan=3 align=right | William Harris
! rowspan=3 | 4

|- style="height:2em"
| 

|- style="height:2em"
! rowspan=3 | 10
| rowspan=3 align=left | Joseph Burton
| rowspan=3  | Republican
| rowspan=3 nowrap | Mar 4, 1901 –Jun 4, 1906
| rowspan=3 | Elected in 1901.Resigned when convicted of bribery.
| rowspan=6 | 8
| 

|- style="height:2em"
| 
| rowspan=6 | 8
| rowspan=6 | Elected in 1903.Lost renomination.
| rowspan=6 nowrap | Mar 4, 1903 –Mar 3, 1909
| rowspan=6  | Republican
| rowspan=6 align=right | Chester I. Long
! rowspan=6 | 5

|- style="height:2em"
| rowspan=4 

|- style="height:2em"
| colspan=3 | Vacant
| nowrap | Jun 4, 1906 –Jun 11, 1906
|  

|- style="height:2em"
! 11
| align=left | Alfred Benson
|  | Republican
| nowrap | Jun 11, 1906 –Jan 22, 1907
| Appointed to continue Burton's term.Lost election to finish Burton's term.

|- style="height:2em"
! rowspan=4 | 12
| rowspan=4 align=left | Charles Curtis
| rowspan=4  | Republican
| rowspan=4 nowrap | Jan 22, 1907 –Mar 3, 1913
| Elected in 1907 to finish Burton's term.

|- style="height:2em"
| rowspan=3 | Elected in 1907 to the next term.Lost renomination.
| rowspan=3 | 9
| 

|- style="height:2em"
| 
| rowspan=3 | 9
| rowspan=3 | Elected in 1909.Lost renomination.
| rowspan=3 nowrap | Mar 4, 1909 –Mar 3, 1915
| rowspan=3  | Republican
| rowspan=3 align=right | Joseph Bristow
! rowspan=3 | 6

|- style="height:2em"
| 

|- style="height:2em"
! rowspan=3 | 13
| rowspan=3 align=left | William H. Thompson
| rowspan=3  | Democratic
| rowspan=3 nowrap | Mar 4, 1913 –Mar 3, 1919
| rowspan=3 | Elected in 1913.Lost re-election.
| rowspan=3 | 10
| 

|- style="height:2em"
| 
| rowspan=3 | 10
| rowspan=3 | Elected in 1914.
| rowspan=7 nowrap | Mar 4, 1915 –Mar 3, 1929
| rowspan=7  | Republican
| rowspan=7 align=right | Charles Curtis
! rowspan=7 | 7

|- style="height:2em"
| 

|- style="height:2em"
! rowspan=17 | 14
| rowspan=17 align=left | Arthur Capper
| rowspan=17  | Republican
| rowspan=17 nowrap | Mar 4, 1919 –Jan 3, 1949
| rowspan=3 | Elected in 1918.
| rowspan=3 | 11
| 

|- style="height:2em"
| 
| rowspan=3 | 11
| rowspan=3 | Re-elected in 1920.

|- style="height:2em"
| 

|- style="height:2em"
| rowspan=5 | Re-elected in 1924.
| rowspan=5 | 12
| 

|- style="height:2em"
| 
| rowspan=5 | 12
| Re-elected in 1926.Resigned to become U.S. Vice President.

|- style="height:2em"
| rowspan=3 
|  
| nowrap | Mar 3, 1929 –Apr 1, 1929
| colspan=3 | Vacant

|- style="height:2em"
| Appointed to continue Curtis's term.Lost election to finish Curtis's term.
| nowrap | Apr 1, 1929 –Nov 30, 1930
|  | Republican
| align=right | Henry Allen
! 8

|- style="height:2em"
| rowspan=2 | Elected in 1930 to finish Curtis's term.
| rowspan=5 nowrap | Dec 1, 1930 –Jan 3, 1939
| rowspan=5  | Democratic
| rowspan=5 align=right | George McGill
! rowspan=5 | 9

|- style="height:2em"
| rowspan=3 | Re-elected in 1930.
| rowspan=3 | 13
| 

|- style="height:2em"
| 
| rowspan=3 | 13
| rowspan=3 | Re-elected in 1932.Lost re-election.

|- style="height:2em"
| 

|- style="height:2em"
| rowspan=3 | Re-elected in 1936.
| rowspan=3 | 14
| 

|- style="height:2em"
| 
| rowspan=3 | 14
| rowspan=3 | Elected in 1938.
| rowspan=6 nowrap | Jan 3, 1939 –Nov 8, 1949
| rowspan=6  | Republican
| rowspan=6 align=right | Clyde M. Reed
! rowspan=6 | 10

|- style="height:2em"
| 

|- style="height:2em"
| rowspan=3 | Re-elected in 1942.Retired
| rowspan=3 | 15
| 

|- style="height:2em"
| 
| rowspan=6 | 15
| rowspan=3 | Re-elected in 1944.Died.

|- style="height:2em"
| 

|- style="height:2em"
! rowspan=10 | 15
| rowspan=10 align=left | Andrew F. Schoeppel
| rowspan=10  | Republican
| rowspan=10 nowrap | Jan 3, 1949 –Jan 21, 1962
| rowspan=6 | Elected in 1948.
| rowspan=6 | 16
| rowspan=4 

|- style="height:2em"
|  
| nowrap | Nov 8, 1949 –Dec 2, 1949
| colspan=3 | Vacant

|- style="height:2em"
| Appointed to continue Reed's term.Retired when successor elected.
| nowrap | Dec 2, 1949 –Nov 28, 1950
|  | Republican
| align=right | Harry Darby
! 11

|- style="height:2em"
| Elected in 1950 to finish Reed's term.
| rowspan=12 nowrap | Nov 29, 1950 –Jan 3, 1969
| rowspan=12  | Republican
| rowspan=12 align=right | Frank Carlson
! rowspan=12 | 12

|- style="height:2em"
| 
| rowspan=3 | 16
| rowspan=3 | Elected to full term in 1950.

|- style="height:2em"
| 

|- style="height:2em"
| rowspan=3 | Re-elected in 1954.
| rowspan=3 | 17
| 

|- style="height:2em"
| 
| rowspan=5 | 17
| rowspan=5 | Re-elected in 1956.

|- style="height:2em"
| 

|- style="height:2em"
| Re-elected in 1960.Died.
| rowspan=5 | 18
| rowspan=3 

|- style="height:2em"
| colspan=3 | Vacant
| nowrap | Jan 21, 1962 –Jan 31, 1962
|  

|- style="height:2em"
! rowspan=9 | 16
| rowspan=9 align=left | James B. Pearson
| rowspan=9  | Republican
| rowspan=9 nowrap | Jan 31, 1962 –Dec 23, 1978
| rowspan=3 | Appointed to continue Schoeppel's term.Elected in 1962 to finish Schoeppel's term.

|- style="height:2em"
| 
| rowspan=3 | 18
| rowspan=3 | Re-elected in 1962.Retired

|- style="height:2em"
| 

|- style="height:2em"
| rowspan=3 | Re-elected in 1966.
| rowspan=3 | 19
| 

|- style="height:2em"
| 
| rowspan=3 | 19
| rowspan=3 | Elected in 1968.
| rowspan=15 nowrap | Jan 3, 1969 –June 11, 1996
| rowspan=15  | Republican
| rowspan=15 align=right | Bob Dole
! rowspan=15 | 13

|- style="height:2em"
| 

|- style="height:2em"
| rowspan=3 | Re-elected in 1972.Retired and resigned early to allow successor gain seniority.
| rowspan=4 | 20
| 

|- style="height:2em"
| 
| rowspan=4 | 20
| rowspan=4 | Re-elected in 1974.

|- style="height:2em"
| rowspan=2 

|- style="height:2em"
! rowspan=12 | 17
| rowspan=12 align=left | Nancy Kassebaum
| rowspan=12  | Republican
| rowspan=12 nowrap | Dec 23, 1978 –Jan 3, 1997
| Appointed to finish Pearson's term, having already been elected to the next term.

|- style="height:2em"
| rowspan=3 | Elected in 1978.
| rowspan=3 | 21
| 

|- style="height:2em"
| 
| rowspan=3 | 21
| rowspan=3 | Re-elected in 1980.

|- style="height:2em"
| 

|- style="height:2em"
| rowspan=3 | Re-elected in 1984.
| rowspan=3 | 22
| 

|- style="height:2em"
| 
| rowspan=3 | 22
| rowspan=3 | Re-elected in 1986.

|- style="height:2em"
| 

|- style="height:2em"
| rowspan=5 | Re-elected in 1990.Retired.
| rowspan=5 | 23
| 

|- style="height:2em"
| 
| rowspan=5 | 23
| rowspan=2 | Re-elected in 1992.Resigned to campaign for U.S. President.

|- style="height:2em"
| rowspan=3 

|- style="height:2em"
| Appointed to continue Dole's term.Lost nomination to finish Dole's term.
| nowrap | Jun 11, 1996 –Nov 7, 1996
|  | Republican
| align=right | Sheila Frahm
! 14

|- style="height:2em"
| rowspan=2 | Elected in 1996 to finish Dole's term
| rowspan=8 nowrap | Nov 7, 1996 –Jan 3, 2011
| rowspan=8  | Republican
| rowspan=8 align=right | Sam Brownback
! rowspan=8 | 15

|- style="height:2em"
! rowspan=12 | 18
| rowspan=12 align=left | Pat Roberts
| rowspan=12  | Republican
| rowspan=12 nowrap | Jan 3, 1997 –Jan 3, 2021
| rowspan=3 | Elected in 1996.
| rowspan=3 | 24
| 

|- style="height:2em"
| 
| rowspan=3 | 24
| rowspan=3 | Re-elected in 1998.

|- style="height:2em"
| 

|- style="height:2em"
| rowspan=3 | Re-elected in 2002.
| rowspan=3 | 25
| 

|- style="height:2em"
| 
| rowspan=3 | 25
| rowspan=3 | Re-elected in 2004.Retired to run for Governor of Kansas.

|- style="height:2em"
| 

|- style="height:2em"
| rowspan=3 | Re-elected in 2008.
| rowspan=3 | 26
| 

|- style="height:2em"
| 
| rowspan=3 | 26
| rowspan=3 | Elected in 2010.
| rowspan=9 nowrap | Jan 3, 2011 –Present
| rowspan=9  | Republican
| rowspan=9 align=right | Jerry Moran
! rowspan=9 | 16

|- style="height:2em"
| 

|- style="height:2em"
| rowspan=3 | Re-elected in 2014.Retired.
| rowspan=3 | 27
| 

|- style="height:2em"
| 
| rowspan=3 | 27
| rowspan=3 | Re-elected in 2016.

|- style="height:2em"
| 

|- style="height:2em"
! rowspan=3 | 19
| rowspan=3 align=left | Roger Marshall
| rowspan=3  | Republican
| rowspan=3 nowrap | Jan 3, 2021 –Present
| rowspan=3 | Elected in 2020.
| rowspan=3 | 28
| 

|- style="height:2em"
| 
| rowspan=3|28
| rowspan=3 | Re-elected in 2022.

|- style="height:2em"
| 

|- style="height:2em"
| rowspan=2 colspan=5 | To be determined in the 2026 election.
| rowspan=2| 29
| 

|- style="height:2em"
| 
| 29
| colspan=5 | To be determined in the 2028 election.

See also

 List of United States representatives from Kansas
 United States congressional delegations from Kansas
 Elections in Kansas

Notes

References

External links 
 

+United States Senators
Kansas